Edward Kessler  (born 3 May 1963) is the Founder President of The Woolf Institute, a leading thinker in interfaith relations, primarily Jewish-Christian-Muslim Relations, a Fellow of St Edmund's College, Cambridge as well as a Principal of the Cambridge Theological Federation and Convenor of the Commission on the Integration of Refugees.

Biography
Born in 1963, Kessler was educated at City of London School and graduated with a First-Class Honours Degree in Hebrew and Religious Studies from the University of Leeds in 1985, an MTS degree from Harvard Divinity School in 1987, and an MBA degree from the University of Stirling in 1989. He went on to work in a family business, Kesslers International Group, for 7 years before returning to his academic studies, completing a PhD degree at the University of Cambridge in 1999.

Kessler, with Martin Forward, founded the Centre for the Study of Jewish-Christian Relations (CJCR) in 1998 and was elected Fellow of St Edmund's College in 2002. In 2006 The Centre for the Study of Muslim-Jewish Relations (CMJR) and the Centre for Policy Public Education were established and the name of the organisation was changed to The Woolf Institute in 2010, and its focus was extended to the study of relationship between religion and society, with a focus on relations between Jews, Christians and Muslims.  It constructed its own building in 2017, located at Westminster College where the Institute is presently located. 

Kessler began plans to convene an independent UK Commission in January 2022 on the Integration of Refugees, which was launched in November. Lord Carlile was appointed Chair and Bishop Guli Francis-Dehqani Vice Chair. The Commission is taking evidence at hearings around the UK and is due to publish its report at the end of 2023.

In 2006, he was awarded the Sternberg Interfaith Award from philanthropist Sir Sigmund Sternberg "in recognition of outstanding services in furthering relations between faiths". In June 2007 The Times Higher Education newspaper described him as "probably the most prolific interfaith figure in British academia". In 2011 he was awarded an MBE awarded for services to interfaith relations Kessler has published 12 books, most recently, Jews, Christians and Muslims which was published in 2013 by SCM and Jesus which was published in 2016 by The History Press. He is presently editing a Documentary History of Jewish-Christian Relations (to be published by Cambridge University Press in 2023).

Kessler was Convenor and Vice-Chair for the Commission on Religion and Belief in British Public Life (2013–15), a two-year initiative that examined the role of religion and belief in Britain. Its report, "Living with Difference" made 37 recommendations and generated public controversy, particularly over faith schools. He was also Principal Investigator of the Woolf Diversity Study, a study of diversity in England and Wales (2017–19), which published a policy report entitled,  How We Get Along.

Much of his academic work has been examining scripture and exploring the significance for Jewish-Christian relations of sharing a sacred text.  He has identified a common exegetical tradition, especially in the formative centuries. More recently his writings have focussed on the encounter with Islam and contemporary relations between the three Abrahamic faiths and implications for fostering a vibrant and open society. Kessler proposes approaches for managing difference, which he argues is vital in forming a positive identity as well as sustaining communities. In his discussion on covenantal theology, he argues for the creation of ‘theological space’ in which people of faith can affirm one another without losing their particularities of faith.

Kessler also explores the tensions, positive as well as negative, between religion and civil society. At a lecture at the Brookings Institution in 2014, he argued that diplomats and policymakers need to be better trained in religion and belief, describing the contemporary religious landscape as a post-interfaith world.  In 2019, at The Council for Religious and Life Stance Communities in Oslo, he argued that because religious monopolies are in decline, Christianity can no longer be portrayed as the dominant ‘host’ religion in Europe and a previously intrinsic relationship is being weakened - belonging to a minority is the norm.

Books and edited volumes
1989 – An English Jew: The Life and Writings of Claude Montefiore, London: Vallentine Mitchell, (2nd Edition, 2002)

2002 – Jews and Christians in Conversation: crossing cultures and generations, eds., E. Kessler, JT Pawlikowski & J Banki, Cambridge: Orchard Academic

2004 – A Reader of Liberal Judaism: Israel Abrahams, Claude Montefiore, Israel Mattuck and Lily Montagu, London: Vallentine Mitchell

2004 – Aspects of Liberal Judaism: Essays in Honour of John D Rayner on the occasion of his 80th Birthday, eds., E. Kessler and D.J.Goldberg, London: Vallentine Mitchell

2004 – Bound by the Bible: Jews, Christians and the Sacrifice of Isaac, Cambridge: Cambridge University Press

2004 – Themes in Jewish-Christian Relations, eds., E. Kessler & M.J. Wright, Cambridge: Orchard Academic

2005 – A Dictionary of Jewish-Christian Relations, eds., E, Kessler & N. Wenborn, Cambridge: Cambridge University Press

2006 – Challenges in Jewish-Christian Relations, eds., J. Aitken & E. Kessler, New York: Paulist Press

2006 – What do Jews Believe? London and New York: Granta Publications

2010 – Introduction to Jewish-Christian Relations, Cambridge: Cambridge University Press

2013 – Jews, Christians and Muslims, London: SCM

2016 – Jesus, Stroud: The History Press

2024 - A Documentary History of Jewish-Christian Relations: From Ancient Times to the Present Day, eds. E. Kessler & N. Wenborn, Cambridge: Cambridge University Press (forthcoming)

Other media and public presence
Kessler regularly appears in the media commenting on religion and belief issues of the day, such as presenting a BBCR4 documentary entitled 'We do do God' (2019), is a regular contributor to the Woolf Institute Blog and hosts the weekly podcast 'Naked Reflections', https://www.thenakedscientists.com/podcasts/naked-reflections.  He also presented the series, Covid-19 Chronicles (2020), which consisted of more than 50 interviews with faith leaders on the impact of the coronavirus on religion and belief. He wrote and presented two A-Z podcasts (2018–20), An A-Z of Believing: From Atheism to Zealotry and An A-Z of the Holy Land: From Arab to Zion. For examples see external links.

He has expressed opposition about any imminent beatification/canonisation of Pope Pius XII.

Kessler has delivered a number of public lectures including:

The 1st Hugo Gryn Memorial lecture, London (1998);
The 30th Cardinal Bea Memorial Lecture, London (2000);
The Shapiro Lecture, Chicago (2003);
The Martin Buber Lecture, East Anglia University (2004);
The Bishop Grossteste Lecture, Lincoln Cathedral (2005);
The Kennedy lecture, North Carolina (2008); 
Ely Cathedral Lectures: 400th anniversary of the publication of the King James Bible.
Changing Landscapes: A lecture on Jews, Christians and Muslims in the UK Today, University of Derby (2012)); The Abrahamic Religions: the prospects for their inter-relations, University of Edinburgh (2013); Religion and International Relations: towards a post-interfaith society, Brookings Institution, Washington, D.C. (2014); 2016 Keeping Faith in Foreign Affairs, University of London (2016); How can Christians, Jews and Muslims move beyond our religious differences and work together to build a better world? (Kirk Interfaith Conference, Glasgow, 2017), Religion and the Nation State, The Council for Religious and Life Stance Communities, Oslo (2019), The Changing Landscape of Religion and Belief: Standing on the Crossroads (University of Suffolk, 2021)

References

External links
 Woolf Institute Home Page
 Commission on Religion and Belief in British Public Life
 BBC Religion & Ethics biographies including of Edward Kessler
 Times Higher Education article
 European Association for Jewish Studies profile of Edward Kessler
 Archived articles by Edward Kessler in The Tablet
 Woolf Institute in the Press, including various articles by Edward Kessler
 Recent example of BBC Radio 4 broadcast, on the subject of the Pope and Holocaust denial
The A-Z of Believing in The Independent 
Woolf Institute podcasts

1963 births
Living people
Alumni of the University of Leeds
Alumni of the University of Stirling
Alumni of the University of Cambridge
Members of the Order of the British Empire
Harvard Divinity School alumni